Angel-in-us Coffee is a coffeehouse chain based in South Korea and owned by the Lotte group.

Expansion 
Angel-in-us coffee, which is operated by Lotte, is steadily expanding its market share in Asia. It expanded to China in 2008 and to Indonesia in November 2011, and currently runs nine shops in China, four in Vietnam, three in Indonesia, and two in Kazakhstan.
 
As of 2017, the chain has over 800 retail stores in South Korea.

In 2018, Angel-in-us released a specialty menu for the spring season, offering beverages made from chocolate blossom.

See also
 List of coffeehouse chains

References

External links
 

Coffee brands
South Korean brands
Coffeehouses and cafés in South Korea